Amy Farrington (born September 20, 1966) is an American actress and model who is best known for her role as Stacey Devers on The Michael Richards Show. Farrington currently portrays Detective Lt. Piper Lynch in the CBS drama series S.W.A.T..

Biography 
Farrington was born in Boston, Massachusetts but raised in Garland, a suburb of Dallas, Texas. After attending a musical theatre conservatory program she worked in local and regional theatres before moving to Chicago. In Chicago, she performed at several theaters including the Bailiwick Repertory Theatre,(Son of Fire, 1993) The Court Theatre and the Steppenwolf Theatre. Twenty plays later she moved to Los Angeles. Her first job was as a series regular in a pilot for NBC, followed by the series, The Michael Richards Show (2000), for the same network. She then went on to star in pilots for several networks and guest-starred and recurred on numerous sitcoms including Will & Grace (1998), Just Shoot Me! (1997), Malcolm in the Middle (2000), Two and a Half Men (2003), The King of Queens (1998), The New Adventures of Old Christine (2006) and Young Sheldon (2018).

On July 8, 2019, Farrington joined the cast of S.W.A.T. in the role of Detective Lt. Piper Lynch, who is a tactical consultant to S.W.A.T.

Filmography

Film

Television

References

External links

Living people
American television actresses
21st-century American actresses
Female models from Massachusetts
Actresses from Boston
People from Garland, Texas
Actresses from Texas
American stage actresses
1966 births